Saroha Rajgan is a village in Kallar Syedan Tehsil, Rawalpindi District, Pakistan. On 1 July 2004 Saroha Rajgan became part of Tehsil Kallar Syedan, which was formerly a Union Council of Kahuta Tehsil.

External links
https://lgcd.punjab.gov.pk/system/files/demarcation%20notifications%20combined%20(1).pdf

Villages in Kallar Syedan Tehsil